Marshfield Municipal Airport  is a city owned public use airport located one nautical mile (2 km) south of the central business district of Marshfield, a city in Wood County, Wisconsin, United States. It is included in the Federal Aviation Administration (FAA) National Plan of Integrated Airport Systems for 2021–2025, in which it is categorized as a local general aviation facility.

Facilities and aircraft 
Marshfield Municipal Airport covers an area of 552 acres (223 ha) at an elevation of 1,278 feet (390 m) above mean sea level. It has two asphalt paved runways: 16/34 is 5,002 by 100 feet (1,525 x 30 m) with approved GPS and NDB approaches; 5/23 is 3,597 by 100 feet (1,096 x 30 m) also with approved GPS and NDB approaches.

The non-directional beacon navigational aid associated with the airport is the Marshfield NDB (MFI), 391 kHz, which is located on the field.

For the 12-month period ending July 8, 2020, the airport had 23,050 aircraft operations, an average of 63 per day: 88% general aviation, 11% air taxi and less than 1% military. In February 2023, there were 15 aircraft based at this airport: 10 single-engine, 3 multi-engine, 1 jet and 1 helicopter.

See also 
 List of airports in Wisconsin

References

External links 
  at Wisconsin DOT airport directory
 

Airports in Wisconsin
Buildings and structures in Wood County, Wisconsin